The 177th Pennsylvania House of Representatives District is located in Philadelphia County and includes the following areas:

 Ward 23 [PART, Divisions 01, 03, 04, 08, 09, 13 and 14]
 Ward 25 [PART, Divisions 01, 02, 03, 04, 05, 06, 07, 08, 10, 11, 12, 22 and 23]
 Ward 31 [PART, Divisions 06, 15, 16, 17, 18 and 19]
 Ward 41 [PART, Divisions 05 and 07]
 Ward 45 [PART, Divisions 01, 02, 03, 04, 05, 06, 07, 12, 15, 18, 20, 22, 23, 24 and 25]
 Ward 55 [PART, Divisions 01, 02, 03, 06, 08, 11, 12, 18, 19, 20, 21, 22, 23, 24, 25, 27 and 29]
 Ward 64 [PART, Divisions 02, 04, 06, 10, 11, 12, 13, 14, 16, 17 and 18]

Representatives

References

Government of Philadelphia
177